Sergey Petrovich Tsoy (born 1957) is a well-known Russian politician and journalist of Korean descent. He is a former Moscow City Hall official and is currently working as a deputy chairman of the world's second largest hydrogenerating company, "RusHydro".

Biography
Sergey Tsoy was born in the Karablak city, the USSR, in 1957. After graduating from the Rostov State University, faculty of journalistics, Tsoy has worked a journalist of the Stroitelnaya newspaper.

Sergey Tsoy married Anita Tsoy in the late 1980s, a future famous Russian pop-singer of Korean descent and has a son.

Career

References

1957 births
Living people
Russian politicians
Russian journalists
Koryo-saram
Russian politicians of Korean descent